Teva I Uta is a commune of French Polynesia, an overseas territory of France in the Pacific Ocean. The commune of Teva I Uta is located on the island of Tahiti, in the administrative subdivision of the Windward Islands, themselves part of the Society Islands. At the 2017 census it had a population of 10,254.

Teva I Uta consists of the following associated communes:

 Mataiea
 Papeari

The administrative centre of the commune is the settlement of Mataiea.

References

Communes of French Polynesia